Madhab is a school of thought within Islamic jurisprudence.

Madhab may also refer to:

People
 Madhab Basnet, Nepalese journalist
 Madhab Chandra Dash (born 1939), Indian ecologist and environmental biologist
 Madhab Rajbangshi (born 1954), Indian politician
 Madhab Sardar, Indian politician
 Beni Madhab Das (1866–1952), Bengali scholar and teacher
 Nila Madhab Panda (born 1973), Indian film producer
 Rudra Madhab Ray (1937–2016), Indian politician
 Dvija Madhab (c. 16th century), Bengali poet

Places
 Madhab, Fujairah
 Madhab Palace
 Madhab Spring Park